Nucleocidin is a fluorine-containing nucleoside produced by Streptomyces calvus.

Chemical Structure 
Nucleocidin stems from the ribonucleoside adenosine - is unique because it possess two rare functional groups: a fluorine atom and a sulfamyl ester 

During 1968 the attempts to identify nucleocidin were made and at that time it was assigned to a structure of a 9-adenyl-4' -sulfamoyloxypentofuranoside, which was mainly based on experiments from pmr and mass spectroscopy, as well as testing in chemical reactions. It was ultimately proven to have a structure of a 4''' -fluoro-5' -O-sulphamoyladenosine.

 Microbiological Origin 
Nucleocidin is an antibiotic produced from Streptomyces calvus. Though toxic to mammals, it is able functions against bacteria both gram negative gram positive. It may be used against trypanosomes.

Though commonly known to be produced by Streptomyces calvus, nucleocidin is produced in greater yield by Streptomyces virens'' and Streptomyces aurorectus.

Biochemical Relevance 
Nucleocidin has anti-parasitic properties. The compound is capable of interrupting the synthesis of peptides.

See also
4-Fluoro-L-threonine

References

Nucleosides
Organofluorides
Fluorine-containing natural products
Sulfamates